These Times may refer to:
 These Times (Mike Stern album), 2004
 These Times (SafetySuit album), 2012
 These Times (The Dream Syndicate album), 2019